Gustav Possler (born November 11, 1994) is a Swedish ice hockey player. He is currently playing with IF Björklöven of the HockeyAllsvenskan (Allsv). Possler was selected by the Buffalo Sabres in the 5th round (130th overall) of the 2013 NHL Entry Draft.

Playing career
Possler made his Elitserien (now the SHL) debut playing with Modo Hockey during the 2011–12 Elitserien season. After the 2015–16 season, having contributed with 24 points in 52 games but unable to prevent Modo from suffering relegation, Possler opted to remain in the SHL, signing a two-year contract with Djurgårdens IF on April 7, 2016.

Career statistics

Regular season and playoffs

International

References

External links

1994 births
Living people
IF Björklöven players
Buffalo Sabres draft picks
Djurgårdens IF Hockey players
Lukko players
Modo Hockey players
Mora IK players
Swedish ice hockey forwards
People from Södertälje
Sportspeople from Stockholm County